Casey Allen Moss (born November 16, 1993) is an American actor and singer. He is known for playing the role of JJ Deveraux on the NBC soap opera Days of Our Lives.

His portrayal of JJ Deveraux earned him a nomination for the Daytime Emmy Award for Outstanding Younger Actor in a Drama Series in 2018.

Career
Moss began his acting career on May 3, 2013, by joining the NBC soap opera, Days of Our Lives. Prior to that, in 2012, he had modeled for James Tudor underwear. He is also in a band called "Eyes of One." They released their first EP, "Reconnection," in May 2014. In June 2015, Moss was announced as Jonathan Lipnicki's replacement as Tyler Dean on the teen television series, Youthful Daze. In December 2016, he was cast in the film 'The Last Champion' as Scott Baker. The movie was directed by Glenn Withrow.

Personal life
Moss was born in Hanford, California, on November 16, 1993.  At the age of 16, he moved to Los Angeles with his father to pursue a career in music. In his spare time, he plays as much music as possible.

He has been dating his former Days of Our Lives co-star True O'Brien since 2015. In 2022, the couple announced their engagement.

Filmography

Nominations

References

External links 

21st-century American male actors
1993 births
Living people
People from Hanford, California
American male soap opera actors
Male actors from California